Safi Saïd, from his complete name Ahmed Safi Ben Ibrahim Ben Haj Ali Saïd, (born 22 September 1953) is a Tunisian journalist and writer. He was a candidate in the 2014 Tunisian presidential election and in the 2019 presidential election.

He is considered to be one of the major intellectuals in Tunisia since 2011, especially after the spread of his expression "the Arab Spring" that he coined to refer to the appraisals that took place across several countries in the Arab world back then.

Personal life 
In his twenties, Safi Saïd left Tunisia to study history, journalism and political sciences in Algeria. At university, he attended lectures of prominent journalists such as Mohamed Hassanein Heikal, John Fontain, John Daniel and Saad Zahran. Inspired by the left atmosphere that prevailed among the intellectuals at that time, he founded along with a group of Arab and African students the "Voluntaria" movement which allowed him to travel to big cities and across continents.

Saïd visited Angola during the Angolan War of Independence and then he visited Cuba, Vietnam and Iraq. He was arrested in Jordan due to doubts about his left-wing relations and visit to these countries. After his release, he moved to Beirut where he witnessed the Lebanese Civil War starting from the year 1976. He joined the press and published articles in many famous Lebanese newspapers. In the late 1980s he settled in Paris where he established two magazines; Gallery 4 and Africana. He returned to Tunisia, and launched in collaboration with "Jeune Afrique" the Arabic version of the same newspaper.

After the Tunisian Revolution, he launched the newspaper Orabia which was first released as a magazine.

In October 2011, Safi Saïd ran as an independent for Constituent Assembly of Tunisia election, representing the city Gafsa. On the occasion of the 2019 Tunisian parliamentary election, he was elected independent deputy from the second district of Tunis.

Career 
As a contributor :

"Al Hadaf" magazine, "Assafir" magazine, "Likul Al Arab" magazine, "Acharq Al Awsat" newspaper, "Al Majala" magazine.

As an Editor in Chief :

"Riwaq 4", Africana, Jeune Afrique in Arabic, Geoarabia, Arabia.

Main publications
 Biography of Ben Bella, ed. Sin Sad, Beirut, 1981
 The satanic triangle, ed. Sin Sad, Beirut, 1986
 The years of the labyrinth: on the altar of the 21st century, ed. Sin Sad, Beirut, 1994
 Fever 42, ed. Bissan Publishers, 1996
 Casino, ed. Dar El Moultaka, Beirut, 1997
 The cursed thresholds in the Middle East, ed. Bissan Publishers, Beirut, 1999
 Bourguiba, a semi-prohibited biography, ed. Riad El Rayyes Books, Beirut, 2000
 The divine gardens, ed. Soutimidia, Tunis, 2001
 Arab's autumn, ed. Bissan Publishers, Beirut, 2005
 The return of imperial time and the end of the fatherland, ed. Riad El Rayyes Books, Beirut, 2006
 The prostate years, ed. Ourabia, Beirut, 2011
 Revolution's dialogues, ed. Ourabia, Beirut, 2012
 Pre-revolutionary deliveries, ed. Ourabia, Beirut, 2013
 Royal seduction, ed. Ourabia, Beirut, 2013
 Post-revolutionary controversy, ed. Ourabia, Beirut, 2014
 The Tunisian equation, ed. Ourabia, Beirut, 2014
 Bloodthirsty geopolitics, ed. Soutimidia, Tunis, 2015
 Kitsch 2011, ed. Soutimidia, Tunis, 2016
 The great call to the last of the Beys, ed. Soutimidia, Tunis, 2017
 Gaddafi, an intact biography, ed. Soutimidia, Tunis, 2018
 Tunisia. How to create the future ?, ed. Soutimidia, Tunis, 2019
 Geopolitics of Nations : The Critical Transition from Imperialism to Meta-imperialism, ed. Soutimidia, Tunis, 2021

His work 

1953 births
Living people
Tunisian journalists
Tunisian writers